Ronnie Mark Mendoza Vicelles (born 10 December 1995) is a Filipino professional boxer. As of December 2021, he is ranked as the seventh best light-flyweight in the world by TBRB.

Professional boxing career
Vicelles made his professional debut against Jonard Tabar on 9 January 2016, whom he by a second-round knockout. He amassed an 11–0 record during the next three years, with five victories coming by way of stoppage. Vicelles was scheduled to challenge Jesse Espinas for the WBA Asia South light-flyweight title on 6 July 2019. He won the fight by majority decision, with scores of 96–94, 96–94 and 95–95.

Vicelles was scheduled to face Junuel Lacar on 7 October 2020, at the IPI Compound in Mandaue, Philippines. He won the fight by a fourth-round knockout. Vicelles was expected to fight Arnold Garde on 18 December 2020, however Garde withdrew from the bout due to health reasons.

Vicelles was scheduled to face Richard Rosales in the main event of a Kumbati series event held on 27 March 2021, at the IPI Compound in Mandaue, Philippines. He won the fight by a fourth-round knockout, stopping Rosales with a left uppercut to the body. Vicelles was scheduled to face the undefeated Jerven Mama on 3 July 2021, in the co-main event of an OPBF Silver featherweight title bout between Pete Apolicar and Jess Rhey Wahimal. He won the fight by a tenth-round knockout, stopping Mama at the very last second of the last round.

Vicelles was expected to face the unbeaten prospect Jayson Vayson on 30 October 2021. A month before the fight was supposed to take place, on 24 September 2021, Vayson withdrew from the fight due to an injury sustained in training. Although Vicelles was supposed to face a replacement opponent, he was likewise forced to withdraw from the bout due to an injury sustained in training. He later revealed that he had suffered a right elbow injury.

Vicelles was scheduled to face the 2018 WBA minimumweight title challenger Toto Landero on 10 December 2021, in the main event of a Kumong Bol-anon II event. He won the fight by unanimous decision, with scores of 96–94, 97–93 and 96–94.

Vicelles is scheduled to face Richard Claveras in the main event of "Kumbati 12" on 26 March 2022, at the IPI Compound in Cebu, Philippines. He won the fight by a first-round technical knockout, forcing the referee to stop the bout after knocking Claveras down twice by the 1:42 minute mark of the opening round. 

Vicelles faced Jaysever Abcede at the next iteration of the Kumbati series, "Kumbati 13", on 17 June 2022. He won the fight by a first-round knockout, dropping Abcede near the end of the opening round. Vicelles was booked to face fellow Filipno Regie Suganob in an IBF junior flyweight title eliminator on 25 February 2023. He lost the fight by technical decision in the sixth round.

Professional boxing record

References

1995 births
Living people
Light-flyweight boxers
Sportspeople from South Cotabato